Charavgiakos Football Club is a Greek football club based in Ilioupoli, Central Athens, Greece.

Honours

Domestic

 Gamma Ethniki Champion (1):
 1985–86
 Delta Ethniki Champion (1):
 1983–84
 Athens FCA Champions (4):
 1982–83, 2012–13, 2016–17, 2017–18

References

Football clubs in Attica
Central Athens (regional unit)
Association football clubs established in 1949
1949 establishments in Greece
Gamma Ethniki clubs